Lock and Dam No. 14 is a lock and dam located near LeClaire, Iowa on the Upper Mississippi River above Davenport, Iowa and Moline, Illinois. It was completed in two phases, the first as part of the six foot channel project from 1921 to 1924, which included a lock and canal bypassing a hazardous rapids. The second phase was part of the nine foot channel project from 1935 to 1939 and included the main dam and the current main lock.

References

External links

Lock and Dam No. 14 - U.S. Army Corps of Engineers

14
Historic American Engineering Record in Iowa
Historic American Engineering Record in Illinois
Moderne architecture in Iowa
Moderne architecture in Illinois
14
Dams completed in 1939
Mississippi River locks
14
Buildings and structures in Rock Island County, Illinois
Buildings and structures in Scott County, Iowa
National Register of Historic Places in Scott County, Iowa
Transportation buildings and structures in Scott County, Iowa
Dams in Illinois
Dams in Iowa
Transport infrastructure completed in 1939
Roller dams
Gravity dams
Dams on the Mississippi River
Mississippi Valley Division
Historic districts on the National Register of Historic Places in Iowa
14
1939 establishments in Iowa
1939 establishments in Illinois
Transportation buildings and structures in Rock Island County, Illinois